This is a list of the winners and nominations for the Primetime Emmy Award for Outstanding Casting for a Drama Series.

Winners and nominations

1990s

2000s

2010s
{| class="wikitable" style="width:100%"
|- bgcolor="#bebebe"
! width="5%" | Year
! width="30%" | Program
! width="60%" | Casting
! width="5%" | Network
|-
| rowspan=7 style="text-align:center" | 2010(62nd)
|- style="background:#FAEB86"
| Mad Men: Season 3
| Laura Schiff and Carrie Audino – casting by
| AMC
|-
| Big Love: Season 4
| Libby Goldstein, Junie Lowry-Johnson, and Lisa Soltau – casting directors
| HBO
|-
| Dexter: Season 4
| Shawn Dawson – casting by
| Showtime
|-
| Friday Night Lights: Season 4
| Linda Lowy and John Brace – casting directors; Beth Sepko – location casting director (Texas)
| DirecTV
|-
| The Good Wife: Season 1
| Mark Saks – casting by
| CBS
|-
| True Blood: Season 2
| Junie Lowry-Johnson and Libby Goldstein – casting directors
| HBO
|-
| rowspan=6 style="text-align:center" | 2011(63rd)
|- style="background:#FAEB86"
| Boardwalk Empire: Season 1
| Ellen Lewis and Meredith Tucker – casting directors
| HBO
|-
| Game of Thrones: Season 1
| Nina Gold and Robert Sterne – casting directors
| HBO
|-
| The Good Wife: Season 2
| Mark Saks – casting director
| CBS
|-
| The Killing: Season 1'
| Junie Lowry-Johnson and Libby Goldstein – casting directors; Stuart Aikins, Corrine Clark, and Jennifer Page – casting directors (Canada)
| rowspan=2|AMC
|-
| Mad Men: Season 4| Laura Schiff and Carrie Audino – casting directors
|-
| rowspan=7 style="text-align:center" | 2012(64th)
|- style="background:#FAEB86"
| Homeland: Season 1| Junie Lowry-Johnson, Libby Goldstein, Judy Henderson, Craig Fincannon, and Lisa Mae Fincannon – casting by
| Showtime
|-
| Boardwalk Empire: Season 2| Meredith Tucker – casting by
| HBO
|-
| Downton Abbey: Season 2| Jill Trevellick – casting by
| PBS
|-
| Game of Thrones: Season 2| Nina Gold and Robert Sterne – casting by
| HBO
|-
| The Good Wife: Season 3| Mark Saks – casting by
| CBS
|-
| Mad Men: Season 5| Laura Schiff and Carrie Audino – casting by
| AMC
|-
| rowspan=6 style="text-align:center" | 2013(65th)
|- style="background:#FAEB86"
| House of Cards: Season 1| Laray Mayfield and Julie Schubert – casting directors
| Netflix
|-
| Downton Abbey: Season 3| Jill Trevellick – casting director
| PBS
|-
| Game of Thrones: Season 3| Nina Gold and Robert Sterne – casting directors
| HBO
|-
| The Good Wife: Season 4| Mark Saks – casting director
| CBS
|-
| Homeland: Season 2| Judy Henderson, Craig Fincannon, and Lisa Mae Fincannon – casting directors
| Showtime
|-
| rowspan=6 style="text-align:center" | 2014(66th)
|- style="background:#FAEB86"
| True Detective: Season 1| Alexa L. Fogel, Christine Kromer, and Meagan Lewis – casting directors
| HBO
|-
| Breaking Bad: Season 5: Part 2| Sharon Bialy, Sherry Thomas, and Kiira Arai – casting directors
| AMC
|-
| Game of Thrones: Season 4| Nina Gold and Robert Sterne – casting directors
| HBO
|-
| The Good Wife: Season 5| Mark Saks – casting director
| CBS
|-
| House of Cards: Season 2| Laray Mayfield, Julie Schubert – casting directors
| Netflix
|-
| rowspan=6 style="text-align:center" | 2015(67th)
|- style="background:#FAEB86"
| Game of Thrones: Season 5| Nina Gold, Robert Sterne, and Carla Stronge – casting directors
| HBO
|-
| Downton Abbey: Season 5| Jill Trevellick – casting director
| PBS
|-
| House of Cards: Season 3| Laray Mayfield and Julie Schubert – casting directors
| Netflix
|-
| Mad Men: Season 6| Laura Schiff and Carrie Audino – casting directors
| AMC
|-
| Orange Is the New Black: Season 2| Jennifer Euston – casting director
| Netflix
|-
| rowspan=6 style="text-align:center" | 2016(68th)
|- style="background:#FAEB86"
| Game of Thrones: Season 6| Nina Gold, Robert Sterne, and Carla Stronge – casting directors
| HBO
|-
| Downton Abbey: Season 6| Jill Trevellick – casting director
| PBS
|-
| House of Cards: Season 3| Laray Mayfield and Julie Schubert – casting directors
| Netflix
|-
| Mr. Robot: Season 1| Susie Farris, Beth Bowling, and Kim Miscia – casting directors
| USA
|-
| Orange Is the New Black: Season 3| Jennifer Euston – casting director
| Netflix
|-
| rowspan=6 style="text-align:center" | 2017(69th)
|- style="background:#FAEB86"
| Stranger Things: Season 1| Carmen Cuba – casting director; Tara Feldstein Bennett and Chase Paris – location casting directors
| Netflix
|-
| The Crown: Season 1| Nina Gold and Robert Sterne – casting directors
| Netflix
|-
| The Handmaid's Tale: Season 1| Sharon Bialy, Sherry Thomas, Russell Scott – casting directors; and Robin D. Cook – location casting director
| Hulu
|-
| This Is Us: Season 1| Tiffany Little Canfield and Bernard Telsey – casting directors
| NBC
|-
| Westworld: Season 1| John Papsidera – casting director
| HBO
|-
| rowspan=6 style="text-align:center" | 2018(70th)
|- style="background:#FAEB86"
| The Crown: Season 2| Nina Gold and Robert Sterne – casting directors
| Netflix
|-
| Game of Thrones: Season 7| Nina Gold and Robert Sterne – casting directors; Carla Stronge - location casting director
| HBO
|-
| The Handmaid's Tale: Season 2| Sharon Bialy, Sherry Thomas, Russell Scott – casting directors; and Robin D. Cook – Canadian casting director
| Hulu
|-
| Stranger Things: Season 2| Carmen Cuba – casting director; Tara Feldstein Bennett and Chase Paris – location casting directors
| Netflix
|-
| Westworld: Season 2| John Papsidera – casting director
| HBO
|-
| rowspan=6 style="text-align:center" | 2019(71st)
|- style="background:#FAEB86"
| Game of Thrones: Season 8| Nina Gold and Robert Sterne – casting directors; Carla Stronge - location casting director
| HBO
|-
| Killing Eve: Season 2| Suzanne Crowley and Gilly Poole – casting directors
| BBC America
|-
| Ozark: Season 2| Alexa L. Fogel – casting director; Tara Feldstein Bennett and Chase Paris – location casting directors
| Netflix
|-
| Pose: Season 1| Alexa L. Fogel – casting director
| FX
|-
| Succession: Season 1| Francine Maisler – original casting; Douglas Aibel and Henry Russell Bergstein – casting directors
| HBO
|}

2020s

Multiple wins

6 wins
 Junie Lowry-Johnson (2 consecutive, twice)

5 wins
 Robert Sterne (2 consecutive)

4 wins
 Nina Gold (2 consecutive, twice)
 Libby Goldstein (2 consecutive)
 John Frank Levey (2 consecutive)
 Barbara Miller (2 consecutive)

3 wins
 Alexa L. Fogel (2 consecutive)
 Avy Kaufman
 Carla Stronge (2 consecutive)

2 wins
 John Brace (consecutive)
 Linda Lowy (consecutive)
 Debi Manwiller
 Kevin Scott (consecutive)
 Julie Tucker 

Programs with multiple wins

3 wins
 Game of Thrones2 wins
 The Crown ER NYPD Blue Six Feet Under Succession The West Wing (consecutive)

Programs with multiple nominations

8 nominations
 Game of Thrones6 nominations
 Mad Men5 nominations
 The Good Wife The Sopranos The West Wing4 nominations
 24 The Crown Downton Abbey Friday Night Lights The Handmaid's Tale House of Cards3 nominations
 ER Grey's Anatomy Law & Order Ozark Stranger Things Succession The Tudors2 nominations
 Big Love Boardwalk Empire Brothers & Sisters Damages Deadwood Homeland House Killing Eve Lost NYPD Blue Once and Again Orange Is the New Black Six Feet Under The Practice True Blood Westworld''

Total awards by network
 HBO – 11
 NBC – 6
 ABC / Netflix– 4
 AMC / CBS / Fox / FX /  Showtime– 1

References

Casting for a Drama Series
Casting awards